The New Bedford Highway Killer is an unidentified serial killer responsible for the deaths of at least nine women and the disappearances of two additional women in New Bedford, Massachusetts, between March 1988 and April 1989. The killer is also suspected to have assaulted numerous other women. All the killer's victims were known sex workers or had struggles with addiction. While the victims were taken from New Bedford, they were all found in different surrounding towns, including Dartmouth, Freetown and Westport, Massachusetts, along Route 140. The main detective that pursued the case was John Dextradeur.

Victims
 Robbin Lynn Rhodes, 29, also referred to as “Bobbie Lynn” was found on March 28, 1989, along Route 140 southbound in Freetown by a search dog. She is believed to have gone missing sometime in March or April 1988. Rhodes had dated suspect Kenneth Ponte. She had a young child and was addicted to heroin and cocaine. While she was never involved in prostitution, she knew many of the other victims and was friends with victim Mary Rose Santos.
 Rochelle Clifford Dopierala, 28, of Falmouth, disappeared sometime during late April 1988. Her body was found on December 10, 1988, in a gravel pit along Reed Road beneath a tree grove, about two miles from Interstate 195, by people riding ATVs. She was partially clothed and had been beaten to death. She had dated and stayed at the home of suspect Kenneth Ponte, who was arrested for her murder, but the charges were eventually dismissed due to a lack of evidence. This was the only time charges were brought in this case. Rochelle had testified against another man who had raped her, but he is not suspected in this case. She was last seen with victim Nancy Paiva’s boyfriend, an ex-convict. He was cleared in both deaths and is not a suspect.
 Deborah Lynn McConnell, 25, of Newport, Rhode Island, was mother to one daughter. Deborah was last seen sometime in May 1988 by her father after the funeral of her mother at the local cemetery. She is believed to have been the third victim. Her body was found on December 1, 1988, off Route 140 northbound in Freetown, through a cadaver dog search. She was found nude with a bra wrapped around her neck.
 Debra Medeiros, 30, of Fall River lived with her mother. Debra was known to both police and family to have had long standing substance abuse issues but no record for prostitution. She was last seen by her boyfriend in New Bedford after a fight, and was reported missing on May 27, 1988. She was the first of the bodies found and she was identified in December 1988. Her body was found on July 3, 1988, by a woman who went to relieve herself just in the woods on the side of the road on Interstate 140 in Freetown. Her remains were severely decomposed with her body positioned on her back with her feet pointed towards the highway. Her cause of death was strangulation, she had a bra wrapped around her neck, and she was found only partially clad. Her boyfriend was ruled out as a suspect. After her death, her mother counselled drug and alcohol addicts in honour of her daughter’s death.
  Christina Monteiro, 19, was last seen sometime in May 1988 and has not been seen or heard from since. Christina had a child and had a known substance abuse history. She was a Cape Verdean American female with brown hair, brown eyes with scars on both wrists and a scar near her left eye. She was between 5’3 and 5’5 and was 110 lbs. She had initials and words tattooed on her arms. She was wearing a shirt, blue jeans and sneakers when she was last seen.
 Marilyn Cardoza-Roberts, 34, was last seen sometime in June 1988 and has not been seen or heard from since. She was reported missing in December 1988. She was neighbours with victim Christina Monteiro, who is also still missing.
 Nancy Lee Paiva, 36, of New Bedford, was last seen walking home from a bar called “Whisper’s Pub” on July 7, 1988, after a reported fight with her boyfriend in the South End in the early hours of the morning. Nancy reportedly had substance abuse issues but was not known to be a prostitute. Nancy had gone to secretarial school, but dropped out. She was married at 19, divorced and had two teenaged daughters. Nancy was known as a very supportive mother and grandmother. At the time of her death, she had a steady boyfriend, who was a drug dealer known to police. Her relationship with her boyfriend had been dysfunctional with domestic violence issues. Her nude body was discovered beside Interstate 195 Westbound in Dartmouth on July 30, 1988, by two men who were riding motorcycles. Her body was found in the same position as victim Debra Medeiro’s – on her back with her feet pointing towards the highway. Nancy’s cause of death was also believed to be strangulation. Her boyfriend is not a suspect in her death.
 Debra Greenlaw Demello, 35, was a mother of three; a fifteen year old daughter, Chandra and two boys who were eight and three respectively at the time of her death. She had struggled with substance abuse issues since her teenage years. She had walked away from a prison work-release program to which she had been sentenced due to a prostitution charge on June 18 and was last seen in New Bedford, on July 11, 1988. Her body was found off the eastbound Reed Road ramp of Interstate 195 by a state highway crew on November 8, 1988. Debra’s nude body was in an area with trees with her clothing strewn in the branches. She was found with some belongings of another victim, Nancy Paiva.
 Mary Rose Santos, 26, of New Bedford, was a mother of two, who was dropped off on July 16, 1988, by her husband, with whom she had recently reconciled, near the downtown bus station and last seen dancing at “The Old Quarterdeck Lounge” five hours later. Friends said her husband had no idea she was working the streets to help pay bills, and she was known to have a substance abuse issue. Mary Rose Santos’ nude body was found with a beer bottle on March 31, 1989, along Route 88 in Westport by two boys. Suspect Kenneth Ponte had represented Mary Santos in a civil case and helped her husband make flyers after her disappearance.
 Sandra Botelho, 24, was a mother of two young sons who were both four and six-years-old. Botelho was known to have a significant substance abuse issue and engaged in prostitution. Botelho reportedly left her apartment on August 11, 1988, at 11 pm and never returned. She was the final body found, located in the woods along Interstate 195 in Marion on April 24, 1989. Her body was nude and reportedly was folded into a foetal position.
 Dawn Mendes, 25, was last seen in New Bedford, on September 4, 1988, walking from her apartment to a family christening party. Mendes was one of ten children and was also the mother of a five-year-old boy. She had a history of prostitution and drug use. Her body was found on November 29, 1988, on the westbound Reed Road ramp off Interstate 195 by a search dog. There were mostly skeletal remains but her hand was able to yield a fingerprint which lead to her being identified. Her mother raised her son after her death.

Suspects

Anthony DeGrazia
In May 1989, Anthony DeGrazia, a 26 year old construction worker’s picture was presented to a locally known New Bedford sex worker in the Weld Square area of New Bedford Massachusetts. One of the sex workers by the name of Margret Medeiros was shown a picture of DeGrazia. Medeiros describes her assailant as having a boxer like build with a flat nose, however, she never identified DeGrazia as a positive suspect, only stating to the detective that he looked like the man who tried to choke her. Medeiros 22 years old then, was brought before a secret grand jury to testify about her attacker. She stated to the grand jury that DeGrazia looked like the man who attacked her and tried to choke her. 

DeGrazia was later picked up for questioning and brought before the secret grand jury but was never indicted. Later, the District Attorney Ronald Pina asked the court judge for a warrant for DeGrazia's arrest accusing him of allegedly 17 attempted rapes and assaults on several other sex workers in the Weld Street area. After DeGrazia was notified about the warrant for his arrest, he and his Defense Attorney, Edward Harrington Esq. of New Bedford (no relation to the presiding Judge on the case) surrendered to the courts. DeGrazia was then arrested, and formally charged with these allegations of 17 rapes and assaults. 

The Judge presiding over the case, (Judge, Edward Harrington) set DeGrazia's bail at $180,000.00 dollars and a one million dollar surety bond. DeGrazia, not being able to make this bail, would spend the next 13 months in the county jail on these allegations brought against him by the District Attorney Ronald Pina. DeGrazia would have 18 court appearances during his 13 months of incarceration in the county jail. DeGrazia's Defense Attorney filed 18 motions before the court for the production documents of evidence including a request for a bail reduction because of the lack of evidence being produced against DeGrazia by the District Attorney's office. Each motion was continually denied by the presiding Judge.      

Finally DeGrazia fired Harrington and hired a Boston Attorney by the name of Robert A. George Esq. Attorney George filed a contempt on the District Attorney's office for non production of evidence and the Judge had no choice but to lower DeGrazia's bail.                  

DeGrazia was finally released from jail on June 27, 1990. Immediately after DeGrazia was released on bail he was rearrested for allegedly uttering threats to the DA Ronald Pina for wrongful prosecution and imprisonment. DeGrazia again posted bond, and was re-released. DeGrazia was later found dead one month after his release on July 17, 1990. DeGrazia's body was found at his ex-girlfriend's parents house in Freetown MA. He was found lying face down under a picnic table in their back yard. His death was ruled a homicide by Freetown Police who first arrived on the scene. However, the District Attorney's Office later ruled his death a suicide. The autopsy report does not support this decision made by the district Attorney's office. The autopsy report ruled DeGrazia's death a homicide. DeGrazia's death came immediately after a Special Prosecutor released Kenneth Ponte as the prime suspect in the serial murder investigation. 

Authorities stated in a public broadcast that it was a timely thing that DeGrazia took his own life after being made aware that he was now being considered the number one prime suspect in connection to the New Bedford highway serial murders. Later this statement made against DeGrazia by the states Special Prosecutor Paul Buckley was retracted by the D.A's office. The family of DeGrazia believes Anthony DeGrazia was murdered. DeGrazia's mother files a federal lawsuit against the District Attorney's office naming Ronald Pina reference; https://caselaw.findlaw.com/us-1st-circuit/1104350.html No evidence was ever found linking Anthony DeGrazia to any of the 17 rapes or assaults he was charged with by the District Attorney Ronald Pina. Also, there has never been any evidences produced by the District Attorney's office connecting Anthony DeGrazia to any of the unsolved highway serial murders of New Bedford Massachusetts.

Kenneth Charles Ponte
In August 1990, a grand jury indicted New Bedford attorney Kenneth Ponte, 40, in the murder of Rochelle Clifford Dopierala, who had been beaten to death. Ponte had a checkered past, including drug use and a prior incident involving Dopierala. Bristol County District Attorney Ronald Pina suggested that Ponte had murdered Dopierala because she was allegedly planning to expose his drug activities.

Dopierala's mother stated that her daughter had once given her telephone number to Ponte in the event she needed to be reached. Ponte admitted to having represented Dopierala in April 1988, shortly before she disappeared, when she accused another man of raping her.

Ponte moved to Port Richey, Florida, in September 1988. He was arraigned on a single count of murder on August 17, 1990. Ponte entered a plea of "absolutely not guilty" and posted a $50,000 bond. On July 29, 1991, the district attorney dropped murder charges against Ponte, citing lack of evidence. The following year, remaining drug and assault charges were dropped and the New Bedford case went cold.

Ponte resurfaced in the news in May 2009 in two separate incidents. Police dug up the driveway and patio of Ponte's former New Bedford home with a backhoe, but were unable to find evidence linking Ponte to any crime. On the morning of May 15, Ponte was arrested for shoplifting and was found with four cans of sardines and a block of cheese stolen from a PriceRite store in New Bedford. On January 27, 2010, Ponte was found dead in his New Bedford home. The Bristol County District Attorney's office has discounted foul play as a cause of death.

Daniel Tavares Jr.
While in prison for the murder of his mother, Daniel Thomas Tavares Junior sent a threatening letter to one of the prison staff indirectly claiming responsibility for the Highway Killings. He lived in New Bedford, and had knowledge of where another murdered woman, Gayle Botelho, had been buried, within a mile from his home. He was convicted of two recent killings, those of Brian and Bev Muack. Additionally, he was convicted in 2015 of the murder of Gayle Botelho, who went missing in 1988, later found to have been under a tree in his backyard.

Lisbon Ripper

Between 1992 and 1993, three sex workers were slain and disemboweled with an instrument that was not a knife in Lisbon, Portugal, by an unknown serial killer that was dubbed the Lisbon Ripper, while two further sex workers were shot dead on the opposite shore of the Tagus river in the same time period. In March 1993, two detectives of the Portuguese Policia Judiciaria traveled to New Bedford to gather information on the Highway killings, while two agents of the FBI traveled to Lisbon, following a hypothesis that the string of crimes on both sides of the Atlantic could have been committed by the same individual. New Bedford has a sizable Portuguese community and many of the Highway victims were of Portuguese ancestry. The Lisbon murders were also linked to four similar killings that took place in Belgium, the Netherlands, Denmark and the Czech Republic (all countries bordering Germany) between 1993 and 1997, the theory being that the Lisbon Ripper had then become a long-haul truck driver.
 
In 2011, a 21-year-old man named Joel applied to participate in the Portuguese edition of the reality show Secret Story, where participants try to guess each other's secrets while concealing their own. The secret he applied with was that his father, José Pedro Guedes, was the Lisbon Ripper. Guedes, 46, was arrested and confessed to the three slayings, but could not be prosecuted because murder has a prescription period of 15 years in Portugal and the last murder's had ended in 2008. Guedes could still be prosecuted for the 2000 murder of a prostitute in Aveiro, Portugal and similar murders in Germany (or neighboring countries) where Guedes resided in the 1990s. It is unknown however, if Guedes ever resided in the United States. Guedes was tried for the Aveiro murder in 2013, found not proven due to lack of evidence.

See also 
 List of fugitives from justice who disappeared
 List of serial killers by number of victims
 List of serial killers in the United States

References

1988 in Massachusetts
1988 murders in the United States
1989 in Massachusetts
1989 murders in the United States
American serial killers
Crimes against sex workers in the United States
Crimes in Massachusetts
Dartmouth, Massachusetts
Female murder victims
Freetown, Massachusetts
Fugitives
History of Bristol County, Massachusetts
Murder in Massachusetts
New Bedford, Massachusetts
Unidentified serial killers
Unsolved murders in the United States
Westport, Massachusetts
History of women in Massachusetts